Dogra is a Unicode block for the Dogri script (also known as Dogra Akkhar script), for writing the Dogri language in Jammu and Kashmir in the northern part of the Indian subcontinent. The Takri script version of Jammu is known as Dogra Akkhar.

Unicode
The Dogra block was added to Unicode in June, 2018 with the release of version 11.0. 

The block is named Dogra, at U+11800–U+1184F, and contains 60 characters:

History 
The following Unicode-related documents record the purpose and process of defining specific characters in the Dogra block:

References

Unicode blocks
Dogri language